Sergei Prokofiev's Piano Sonata No. 10 in E minor, Op. 137 (1952) (unfinished) is a sonata composed for solo piano.

Movements
 unfinished - fragment

References

External links
Prokofiev Piano Sonata No 10 in E minor, Opus 137 (1952) (unfinished).
Video - Prokofiev Piano Sonata No 10 (fragment)/audio (01:14).

Compositions by Sergei Prokofiev
Piano sonatas by Sergei Prokofiev
20th-century classical music
1952 compositions
Unfinished musical compositions
Compositions in E minor
Piano compositions in the 20th century